Sanam Baloch Hisbani or Jatoi (born 14 July 1986) credited as Sanam Baloch  is a Pakistani actress and television presenter. She has hosted various television  shows such as; Sanam Small Room on KTN and the morning show on Samaa TV. As an actress, she has starred in critically acclaimed drama series, such as Dastaan (2010) and Durr-e-Shehwar (2012).

Personal life
Baloch married her colleague  Abdullah Farhatullah on 12  October 2013 in a simple nikah ceremony in Karachi. Farhatullah is a singer,   songwriter and host. They had met while working for Samaa TV and had been good friends for a long time. Upon her marriage, Baloch changed her name to Sanam Abdullah. Baloch's PR team dismissed rumours of a divorce in April 2018.

In October 2018, Baloch confirmed that she and Abdullah have separated. Although they maintain a cordial relationship with each other, they are no longer friends.

In August 2020, Baloch confirmed news about her second marriage.

Career
Baloch began her career as a talk show anchor in Sindhi television channel KTN. She hosted two shows Sanam Small Room and Diyoo on KTN. She appeared in Fahad Mustafa's long play Kalaq. She has also performed in Urdu and Sindhi language music videos.
Baloch appeared with Fawad Khan in the Hum TV drama Dastaan. Her next role was in the women's rights drama Kankar with Fahad Mustafa  She was seen in Noorpur Ki Rani as Noorulain Aneez.

She hosted morning show Morning With Hum on Hum TV, but then moved to Samaa TV for a morning show Subha Saveray Samaa Ke Saath.
She married Abdullah Farhatullah who also hosts a show on Samaa TV. previously She hosted morning show on ARY News. She left ARY News in 2018. Currently she hosts "morning show" on Samaa TV.

Pakistani films like  Bin Roye and Balu Mahi and many others was also offered to Sanam Baloch in fact she had signed Bin Roye as well but later she cancelled the contract with Hum TV in lieu of her morning show with ARY News and her wedding.

Baloch is one of the highest-paid actresses of Pakistan.

Television

Awards and nominations
Pakistan Media Award for Best Actress for Dastaan (2011)'''
 Hum Award for Best Actor Popular nominated for Dastaan
 Hum Award for Best Actress nominated for Roshan Sitara (2012)

 Hum Award for Best TV Actress nominated for Kankar (TV series)
 Pakistan Media Awards for Best Morning Show Host Subah Saveray Samaa ke Saath
 PTV Awards Best Actress nominated for Sehra Teri Piyas (2012)
Lux Style Awards

Music videos
 Shahnila Ali's jogi  music video (2006).
 Najaf Ali's Choodiyun music video (2008).
 Amanat Ali's Thumri'' music video (2010).

References

External links
 
 

Living people
Baloch people
Pakistani film actresses
Pakistani television hosts
Actresses from Karachi
Pakistani television actresses
21st-century Pakistani actresses
ARY News newsreaders and journalists
1986 births
Women television journalists
Pakistani women television presenters
Actresses in Urdu cinema